Green is the debut album of Chicago pop band Green. It was released on Gang Green Records in 1986.

Critical reception
The Chicago Reader wrote that the album "refracts hooky midwestern power pop from the late 70s and early 80s—Cheap Trick, the Shoes—through the prisms of British-invasion rock and brash punk ... insanely catchy." Trouser Press called it "an inadequately produced but brilliant collection of weirdly derivative originals played with spirit and power." Perfect Sound Forever wrote: "Hearing Green was like hearing The Beatles' Second Album for the first time; an overwhelming freshness coupled with eerie familiarity... like experiencing music for the first time for the second time ... It's one of the most startling debuts ever recorded."

Track listing
All songs written by Jeff Lescher.

Personnel

Green
John Diamond – bass guitar, vocals
Jeff Lescher – guitar, vocals
John Valley – drums

Additional musicians and production
Green – production

References

External links 
 

1986 debut albums
Green (band) albums